Ermita de la Virgen de la Peña  (Hermitage of the Virgin of the Rock) is a catholic monastery and holy site in the hills overlooking Aniés, La Sotonera Municipality, Aragon, Spain.

The oldest parts of the sanctuary date to Roman times, while much was built in the 13th century. The hermitage is only accessible on foot, via a steep path in the forest and through caves in the mountain.

See also
Ermita de la Virgen de la Peña (Mijas)
Church of the Virgin of the Rocks, San Pedro Manrique

References

Christian hermitages in Spain
Populated places in the Province of Huesca
Roman Catholic monasteries in Europe